Krzysztof Maciej Bąkowski (born 4 January 2003) is a Polish professional footballer who plays as a goalkeeper for I liga side Stal Rzeszów, on loan from Lech Poznań.

Career statistics

Club

References

2003 births
Living people
Footballers from Poznań
Polish footballers
Poland youth international footballers
Poland under-21 international footballers
Association football goalkeepers
Lech Poznań II players
Lech Poznań players
OKS Stomil Olsztyn players
Stal Rzeszów players
I liga players
II liga players